Fabianite is a borate mineral with the chemical formula CaB3O5(OH). It is colorless and leaves a white streak. Its crystals are monoclinic prismatic. It is transparent and fluorescent. It has vitreous luster. It is not radioactive. Fabianite is rated 6 on the Mohs Scale. It was named for Hans-Joachim Fabian, a German geologist.

See also

 List of minerals

References

Webmineral Entry
Mineral Handbook

Calcium minerals
Phylloborates
Monoclinic minerals
Minerals in space group 14